René Soulier (29 September 1911 – May 1991) was a French middle-distance runner. He competed in the men's 800 metres at the 1936 Summer Olympics.

References

1911 births
1991 deaths
Athletes (track and field) at the 1936 Summer Olympics
French male middle-distance runners
Olympic athletes of France
Place of birth missing